The College of Veterinary Medicine at the University of Missouri is a school of veterinary medicine in Columbia, Missouri. It is one of only 30 veterinary colleges in the United States accredited by the American Veterinary Medical Association and only one in Missouri. In 2019 U.S. News & World Report ranked the school 19th best veterinary school in the United States.

Veterinary Health Center
The Mu Veterinary Health Center encompasses a 24-hr emergency room, a small animal hospital, an equine hospital, a food animal hospital, a medical diagnostic laboratory. There is also an emergency center in Kansas City, and a clinic in Wentzville. A partnership with the Adair County Humane Society was announced in 2019.

References

External links
Official site

University of Missouri
Educational institutions established in 1946
Education in Columbia, Missouri
1946 establishments in Missouri
Veterinary schools in the United States
University subdivisions in Missouri